Alexander Doniphan Wallace (21 August 1905, in Hampton, Virginia, USA – 16 October 1985, in New Orleans, USA) was an American mathematician who introduced proximity spaces.

Wallace received from the University of Virginia B.A. in 1935, M.A. in 1936 and Ph.D. in 1940. He was an instructor at Princeton University in 1940–1941 and became an assistant professor in mathematics at the University of Pennsylvania in 1941 and remained there until 1947. He was a professor and chair of the mathematics department at Tulane University in 1947–1963. From 1963 until his retirement in 1973 he was a mathematics professor at the University of Florida.

His doctoral students include Chung Tao Yang.

Selected articles

References

1905 births
1985 deaths
20th-century American mathematicians
People from Hampton, Virginia
Mathematicians from Virginia
Topologists
University of Virginia alumni
University of Pennsylvania faculty
Tulane University faculty
University of Florida faculty